Human uncharacterized protein CXorf65 is encoded by the gene CXorf65, which is located on the minus strand of chromosome X. Its transcript is 834 nucleotides long and consists of 6 exons. The translated protein is 183 amino acids in length. with a molecular weight of 21.3 kDa

Gene 
Human chromosome X open reading frame 65 (CXorf65), also known as LOC158830 or A6NEN9, spans 2,852 base pairs on the minus strand of chromosome X at Xq13.1. It belongs to the gene family pfam 15874; a two-member family for conserved putative interleukin 2 receptor gamma chain (Il2rg) domains. Additionally, human CXorf65 is one of 413 genes which belong to gene cluster 31: Spermatids – Spermatogenesis.

Transcript 
Human CXorf65’s mRNA transcript contains 6 exons which form an 834 nucleotide strand.

Isoforms 
Human CXorf65 has three isoforms: uncharacterized protein CXorf65, uncharacterized protein CXorf65 isoform X1, and a non-coding RNA sequence. Only uncharacterized protein CXorf65 produces a functional product.

Human uncharacterized protein CXorf65 isoform X1 is an alternative splicing that results in the exclusion of exon 4, which shortens the transcript by 69 base pairs and ultimately leads to a nonfunctional protein. The non-coding RNA sequence suffers from a frameshift mutation due to a 19 bp deletion in exon 2. This results in a premature stop codon 126 bp from the start of translation.

Expression 
Human CXorf65 is ubiquitously expressed throughout the body at low levels, typically ranging from 1-7 RPKM in most tissues; however, it’s expression has an affinity for testis, adrenal, thymus, and bone marrow tissues which can lead to RPKM levels increasing to 6-14 RPKM Additionally, expression can spike to as high as 27 RPKM within adrenal tissues during week 20 of fetal development.

Protein 

Human uncharacterized protein CXorf65 consists of 183 amino acids. has a molecular weight of 21.3 kDa, and a predicted isoelectric point of 10.33. CXorf65's protein product is predicted to primarily localize within the nucleus.

Expression 
Human CXorf65 maintains a low whole organism protein abundance at 0.062 ppm2. It has also been identified as a member of the spermatozoa proteome.

Regulation 
Human uncharacterized protein CXorf65 has a bipartite nuclear localization signal, which regulates its transport into the nucleus.

Structure 
Human uncharacterized CXorf65's secondary structure is predicted to have five sections of β-sheets and four sections of α-helixesm The corresponding tertiary structure is thus predicted to be a β-grasp fold accompanied by a long basic (positively charged) tail.

Post-Translational Modifications 
Human uncharacterized protein CXorf65 has one predicted casein kinase II phosphorylation site and two predicted acetylation sites. Additionally, uncharacterized protein CXorf65 has predicted motifs for N-terminal degradation via type II destabilizing residues and a non-covalent binding site for SUMO (small ubiquitin-like modifier) proteins.

Homology

Orthologs 

Human CXorf65 orthologs exist in mammals, reptiles, aves, amphibians, bony fish, cartilaginous fish, and the following invertebrates: Cnidaria, Platyhelminthes, Annelida, Arthropoda, Mollusca, Rotifera, Lophophorata, Echinodermata, Hemichordate Amphioxiformes, and Tunicata

Paralogs 
There are no human paralogs of CXorf65; however, there is a paralogous Il2rg domain within C22orf15,

Evolution 
CXorf65 is a moderately evolving gene in reference to fibrinogen alpha and cytochrome c.

Function

Interacting Proteins 
CXorf65 has been documented to co-express with IL2RG in Mus musculus (mouse). an interleukin subunit coding gene located within the same gene neighborhood in humans at Xq13.1. Fusions between these two genes have been observed within the following organisms: Sarcophilus harrisii (Tasmanian devil), Felis catus (Cat), Cavia porcellus (Guinea pig), Ictidomys tridecemlineatus (Thirteen-lined ground squirrel), Rattus norvegicus (Brown rat), and Mus musculus (Mouse)

Clinical Significance

Health & Disease 
Differential expression of CXorf65 in humans is correlated to azoospermia and impaired spermatogenesis while general expression of the gene has been linked to an improved prognosis in urothelial and ovarian cancer. In WG4 temporal lobe epilepsy, human CXorf65 undergoes hypermethylation.
In cases of disc herniation, acute coronary syndrome and with the presence of TGF-β in eosinophils human CXorf65 is downregulated.

References